The chestnut climbing mouse (Dendromus mystacalis) is a species of rodent in the family Nesomyidae.
It is found in Angola, Democratic Republic of the Congo, Ethiopia, Kenya, Lesotho, Malawi, Mozambique, Rwanda, South Africa, Eswatini, Tanzania, Uganda, Zambia, and Zimbabwe.
Its natural habitats are dry savanna and moist savanna.

References
 Coetzee, N. & Monadjem, A. 2004.  Dendromus mystacalis.   2006 IUCN Red List of Threatened Species.   Retrieved 9 July 2007.
 Musser, G. G. and M. D. Carleton. 2005. Superfamily Muroidea. pp. 894–1531 in Mammal Species of the World a Taxonomic and Geographic Reference. D. E. Wilson and D. M. Reeder eds. Johns Hopkins University Press, Baltimore.

Dendromus
Rodents of Africa
Mammals described in 1863
Taxonomy articles created by Polbot